is a Japanese manga artist. He is best known for Co-creating the post-apocalyptic martial arts series Fist of the North Star (1983–1988) with writer Buronson, which is one of the best-selling manga in history with over 100 million copies in circulation.

Early life
Although born in Tokyo, Hara lived in Matsubara-danchi in Sōka, Saitama. He is a cousin of comedian Ryo Fukawa. Hara began drawing characters from Osamu Tezuka's Astro Boy and Jungle Emperor Leo, as well as Ikki Kajiwara and Naoki Tsuji's Tiger Mask in first and second grade. In third and fourth grade he was obsessed with Shotaro Ishinomori's Kamen Rider manga, while the work of Fujio Akatsuka showed him how diverse the medium could be.

Hara had decided to become a manga artist by second and third grade. In middle school he read manga about becoming one, as well as autobiographical manga, and studied yonkoma to improve his sequencing. He then entered the design program at his high school, joined the "manga gekiga club," and submitted entries to manga competitions run by magazines. Hara also found inspiration by visiting the workplace of Osamu Akimoto, who was an alumnus of his high school.

Career
He worked as an assistant to manga artist Yoshihiro Takahashi after graduating. As an amateur, he won the first prize of the 33rd Fresh Jump award for his boxing short story Super Challenger. Hara's professional career began with his first published work: Mad Fighter in 1982. His first serialized work in the Weekly Shōnen Jump was the Iron Don Quixote, a motocross manga which lasted only ten weeks in serialization. He achieved fame after the publication of Fist of the North Star in 1983, which he co-created with Buronson and ran for six years in Weekly Shōnen Jump. His next long-running serial was Keiji, a period tale loosely based on a novel by Keiichiro Ryu, which was published in Weekly Shōnen Jump from 1990 to 1993. It was through Kazuhiko Torishima that Hara received the offer from Capcom to create the character designs for the 1993 video game Saturday Night Slam Masters. Hara would go on to produce several shorter serials and one-shots for Shueisha until departing from the company in 2000.

In 2001, he became one of the founding members of the manga editing company Coamix and would go on to illustrate Fist of the Blue Sky, a prequel to Fist of the North Star, which was serialized in Weekly Comic Bunch from 2001 until the magazine's final issue in 2010. Originally published as a weekly serial, it was changed to a semi-regular feature after Hara was diagnosed with keratoconus.

Despite previously announcing his intentions to retire after completing Fist of the Blue Sky, he went on to illustrate his current series Ikusa no Ko: The Legend of Nobunaga Oda, written by Seibo Kitahara and published in Monthly Comic Zenon since 2010. An English edition of Ikusa no Ko is concurrently published at the official Silent Manga Audition Community website. In 2021, Hara said that rather than creating work on his own, he was more interested in working with younger artists to create works as a team and pass on his forty years of experience.

Influences
Hara has cited Fujio Akatsuka, Shotaro Ishinomori, Tetsuya Chiba, and Ryoichi Ikegami as some of his influences. The comedy in Akatsuk'a work showed him the "power" of manga and how fun it can be. Ishinomori's designs for heroes and monsters instilled in Hara to never get lazy with character designs, even for those that are killed off quickly. Chiba's work taught him that as long as the characters are interesting, they can move and progress the story on their own. Hara said that Ikegami had the biggest impact on his art, as the "realism and luster" in his characters show the "power" of gekiga.

Hara admits that from the very beginning of his career, he has never been good at creating the stories of manga. Instead he focuses on showcasing his art skills and creating characters. He credits his first editor, Nobuhiko Horie, for continuing to work with him his whole career and "helping to fill in for my weaknesses and further develop my strengths." He described the process as starting with Horie proposing a storyline, while Hara focuses on the characters and art direction and creates the storyboard. Hara then instructs his staff to help with the final product, describing the entire process as relying on "the strengths of each person to create something greater than the sum of its parts." For Fist of the North Star specifically, Hara revealed that he and Buronson did not see each other much and never had meetings directly about work. Instead, Horie acted as go-between for the two.

Works

Manga

Serials

One-shots

Novel illustrations
 Kōryū no Mimi - (2 volumes, 1991–1993)
 Ichimu An Fūryū Ki (1 volume, 1992 Shueisha Bunko edition)
 Hokuto no Ken: Jubaku no Machi (1 volume, 1995)
Miyamoto Musashi (8 volumes, 2013 Takarashimasha Bunko edition)

Other works
 Saturday Night Slam Masters/Muscle Bomber (1993 arcade game) - promotional illustrations. The character portraits in the arcade version were done by another artist, but they were replaced by Hara's own renditions in the console versions for the Super NES and Sega Genesis.
 Muscle Bomber Duo (1993 arcade game) - promotional illustrations
 Ring of Destruction: Slam Masters II/Super Muscle Bomber (1994 arcade game) - promotional and in-game illustrations.
 Itadaki Muscle! (2006 TV series) - illustrations for the opening intro.
 Mori no Senshi Bonolon (2006 anime series) - producer, character designer
 Gifū Dōdō!! Naoe Kanetsugu -Maeda Keiji Tsuki-gatari- (2008–2010 manga series) - co-author with Nobuhiko Horie, illustrated by Yuji Takemura
 Thank You for the Music! (2010 album by Ryo Fukawa) - back cover illustration
 Gifū Dōdō!! Naoe Kanetsugu -Maeda Keiji Sake-gatari- (2010–2014 manga series) - co-author with Nobuhiko Horie, illustrated by Yuji Takemura
 Gifū Dōdō!! Hayate no Gunshi -Kuroda Kanbee- (2013–2017 manga series) - co-author with Nobuhiko Horie, illustrated by Toshiaki Yamada 
 Gifū Dōdō!! Naoe Kanetsugu -Maeda Keiji Hana-gatari- (2014–2018 manga series) - co-author with Nobuhiko Horie, illustrated by Masato Deguchi
 Maeda Keiji Kabuki Tabi (2019–present manga series) - co-author with Nobuhiko Horie, illustrated by Masato Deguchi

References

External links

Hara Tetsuo Official Website

1961 births
Living people
People from Shibuya
Manga artists from Tokyo
Fist of the North Star